The Salenioida are an order of sea urchins.

Description and characteristics 
They are distinguished from other sea urchins by the presence of a large plate on the upper surface, with the anus to one side. They have very large tubercles between the ambulacral plates, and much smaller ones on the ambulacral plates themselves.

Taxonomy 
According to World Register of Marine Species : 
 family Saleniidae L. Agassiz, 1838
 family Acrosaleniidae Gregory, 1900†
 family Goniophoridae Smith & Wright, 1990†
 family Hyposaleniidae Mortensen, 1934†
 family Pseudosaleniidae Vadet, 1999b†

References
 
 

Echinacea (animals)
Echinoderm orders
Extant Middle Jurassic first appearances